Footsoldier in the Moonlight is the seventh album by American rock singer Donnie Iris, released in 1993.

Track listing
"Kamakazi" (Avsec) 
"Intentional Infliction of Emotional Distress" (Avsec)
"The Best Possible World" (Avsec) 
"Mercy Mercy Me" (Marvin Gaye)
"Minnie the Moocher" (Cab Calloway, Irving Mills)
"Rally with Sally" (Avsec)
"Gloria" (Van Morrison)
"A Sword and a Shield" (Avsec)
"The Reasonable Prudent Person" (Avsec) 
"The First Love" (Avsec)

Personnel

Donnie Iris and the Cruisers
Donnie Iris - lead and background vocals, guitar  	 
Mark Avsec - keyboards, harmonica and background vocals 	 
Marty Lee Hoenes - guitars and background vocals 	 
Scott Alan Williamson - bass guitar and background vocals
Steve McConnell - drums and percussion

Additional musicians
Pete Tokar - additional percussion on "The Best Possible World" and "Mercy Mercy Me"
Kenny Blake - alto saxophone on "Mercy Mercy Me"
Danna Avsec - Hammond organ on "The Best Possible World," DD-12 conga percussion on "The First Love"

Production
Design: Marty Hoenes
Engineer: Jerry Reed
Executive Producer: Mike Belkin
Mixing: Pete Tokar
Producer: Mark Avsec

References

Donnie Iris albums
1993 albums
Albums produced by Mark Avsec